The Ministry of Foreign Affairs and International Cooperation ( or MAECI) is the foreign ministry of the government of the Italian Republic. It is also known as the Farnesina as a metonym from its headquarters, the Palazzo della Farnesina in Rome. The current Minister of Foreign Affairs is Antonio Tajani.

History
The first official manifestation of the Ministry of Foreign Affairs was called The Secretary of the State of Foreign Affairs for the now defunct Kingdom of Sardinia.  The original name was derived from the Albertine Statute that founded the Ministry in 1848. The original location was the Palazzo della Consulta in Rome, where it remained until 1922.

The first significant reform came under the direction of the minister Carlo Sforza who reorganized the Ministry around territorial bases.  However, this system was later replaced during Benito Mussolini's fascist regime.  During this time the Ministry was housed at Palazzo Chigi; after a brief period in Brindisi during the war, Cabinet President Pietro Badoglio restored the full services of the Ministry with a ministerial decree on 15 July 1944.

Since 1959 the Ministry has been at its current location in Palazzo della Farnesina, which together with the Reggia di Caserta is one of the biggest buildings in Italy.

Functions
The current role of the MAECI are laid out in the laws passed on 23 April 2003 n. 109 which states that the Ministry holds the explicit function of representing and guarding the interests of Italy concerning its political, economic, social, and cultural relations with the world and its direct relations with other states and international organizations.  The ministry represents Italy in its implementation and revisions of treaties and international conventions.  Within the organization of the European Union, the ministry advocates Italy's positions on councils of foreign politics and common security such as, CFSP, The European Community and Euratom. It cooperates with international organizations on issues of development, immigration, and the protection of Italians and workers abroad.

List of Ministers (since 1946)

See also

 Carabinieri Foreign Ministry Command

References

External links
 Ministry of Foreign Affairs Official Site
 Ministero degli Affari Esteri. Archivio Storico Diplomatico (archives); + collection inventories

1848 establishments in Italy
Foreign
Italy
Italy, Foreign Affairs